Elections in Liberia occur solely at the national level. The head of state, the President of Liberia, is elected to a six-year term in a two-round system, in which a run-off between the two candidates with the highest number of votes is held should no single candidate earn a majority of the vote in the first round. The Legislature has two elected chambers.

The House of Representatives has 73 members, elected to six-year terms by the first-past-the-post method in single-member districts. The Senate has 30 members, 2 from each county, elected at-large to nine-year terms by the first-past-the-post method. Senatorial elections are staggered, with one senator from each county being elected in elections held three years apart, followed by a six-year period in which no senatorial elections are held.

All citizens who are 18 years or older may register to vote in elections. Under Article 83(a) of the Constitution, elections are held on the second Tuesday of October every election year, with presidential run-off elections being held on the second Tuesday following the announcement of the results of the first round. Elections are regulated by the National Elections Commission of Liberia (NEC).

The first round of a general election to elect the President and House of Representatives on 10 October 2017, resulted in a run-off between ex-football star George Weah and Vice President Joseph Boakai. George Weah won the run-off with more than 60% of the ballots cast.

Latest elections

Presidential elections

House of Representatives elections

Senate elections

See also
National Election Commission (Liberia)
Politics of Liberia

References

External links
African Elections Database
Adam Carr's Election Archive